The 2018–19 Xavier Musketeers women's basketball team represents Xavier University during the 2018–19 NCAA Division I women's basketball season. The Musketeers, led by eighth-year head coach Brian Neal, play their games at the Cintas Center and are members of the Big East Conference. They finished the season 11–19, 2–16 in Big East play to finish in last place. They lost in the first round of the Big East women's tournament to Providence.

On March 10, Brian Neal was fired. He finished at Xavier with a 8 year record of 76–108.

Roster

Schedule

|-
!colspan=9 style=| Non-conference regular season

|-
!colspan=9 style=| Big East regular season

|-
!colspan=9 style=| Big East Women's Tournament

See also
2018–19 Xavier Musketeers men's basketball team

References

Xavier
Xavier Musketeers women's basketball seasons